George Myers may refer to:
 George Hewitt Myers (1875–1957), American forester and philanthropist
 George Myers (builder) (1803–1875), builder best known for his work with the architect Augustus Pugin
 George S. Myers (1905–1985), American ichthyologist
 George S. Myers (judge) (1881–1940), American lawyer and politician in Ohio
 George Myers (baseball) (1860–1926), American Major League Baseball catcher
 George Myers (hotelier), Bahamian businessman
 George W. Myers (1864–1931), American astronomer, mathematician and progressive educator
 George A. Myers, member of the Ohio House of Representatives

See also
George Meyer (disambiguation)
George Meyers (1865–1943), American baseball player